Carne inquieta is a 1952 Italian melodrama film.

Plot 
Peppe is a Calabrian boy who falls in love with Fema, who belongs to a local noble family. The refusal of the girl's father to the marriage proposal convinces the boys to flee, but they are hindered by the population of the town.

References

External links
 

1952 films
1950s Italian-language films
Films scored by Alessandro Cicognini
Italian drama films
1952 drama films
Italian black-and-white films
1950s Italian films